Criterion Capital is a privately-held British property company, which owns and manages property estate in prime areas of London, particularly in Leicester Square and Piccadilly Circus.

History 
The company was founded by current Chief Executive Asif Aziz, a Malawi-born developer. The company's flagship project is the London Trocadero leisure complex on Piccadilly Circus, which was acquired in 2005. Part of the building was converted into a hotel which opened in 2020: the Zedwell Piccadilly has 728 windowless rooms and a large rooftop bar.

In April 2020, the company served its tenants with notices that they would be met with legal action if they did not pay rent during the COVID-19 pandemic in the United Kingdom, despite the government moratorium on evictions. The company extended rent-free periods to some tenants that were deemed to be "in need." Plans were submitted in May 2020 to develop parts of the building's basement into a mosque. These plans drew controversy as the Picadilly neighborhood was known for its nightlife rather than places of worship.

Criterion Capital is also developing projects in Croydon with the purchase of two office buildings around 2015, and has a riverside site at Enderby's Wharf, East Greenwich.

The ultimate owner of the company is a trust linked to Aziz, via ACT Property Holdings Ltd, an Isle of Man company.

In 2022, the company invested €80 million into residential apartments in Miraflores, Portugal. This was the company's first expansion outside of the United Kingdom.

References

Property companies of England

External links 
https://www.criterioncapital.co.uk/